Fire Station No. 13 may refer to:

Station 13 Minneapolis Fire Department, Minneapolis, MN, NRHP-listed
Firehouse No. 13, Louisville, KY, NRHP-listed
Engine House No. 13 (Tacoma, Washington), NRHP-listed

See also
List of fire stations